Tachyphonus is a genus of birds in the tanager family Thraupidae.

The genus was introduced by the French ornithologist Louis Pierre Vieillot in 1816 with the white-lined tanager as the type species. The name combines the Ancient Greek words takhus "fast" and phōneō  "to speak".

Taxonomy
A molecular phylogenetic study of the tanager family published in 2014 indicated that the genus as defined her is polyphyletic and paraphyletic relative to Lanio and Rhodospingus.

The genus includes 5 species:

References

 
Bird genera